Government Agents vs Phantom Legion (1951) is a 12-chapter American black-and-white action film serial produced and distributed by Republic Pictures Corporation in 1951. It is an original, studio-commissioned screenplay by Ronald Davidson, produced by Franklin Adreon and directed by Fred C. Brannon.

Plot
Two American government agents, Hal Duncan and Sam Bradley, must prevent agents of a foreign power, led by Regan and Cady, from hijacking trucks and stealing defense materials being transported by truck. They are hired by an interstate trucking association whose constituent truck lines have been principal targets of the hijacking, and it becomes evident that one of the four directors of the association is "the Voice," the secret leader of the gang who provides them with shipment and route information necessary for the gang's success.

Cast
Walter Reed as Hal Duncan
Mary Ellen Kay as Kay Roberts
Dick Curtis as Regan
Fred Coby as Cady
John Pickard as Sam Bradley
Pierce Lyden as Armstrong
Arthur Space as Crandall
Mauritz Hugo as Thompson/The Voice
George Meeker as Willard
Stunts
Dale Van Sickel as Hal Duncan/Brice/Kern (doubling Walter Reed)
Tom Steele as Regan/Armstrong/Brandt/Warehouse Thug (doubling Dick Curtis and Pierce Lyden)
Eddie Parker as Payne
Duke Taylor as Kirk
David Sharpe

Production
Government Agents vs. Phantom Legion was budgeted at $153,083 although the final negative cost was $153,612 (a $529, or 0.3%, overspend). It was the cheapest Republic serial of 1951.

It was filmed between May 1 and 23, 1951 under the working title Government Agents vs. Underground Legion. The serial's production number was 1931.

All special effects in Government Agents vs Phantom Legion were produced by Republic's in-house team of the Lydecker brothers.

Release
Government Agents vs. Phantom Legion'''s official release date was July 4, 1951, although this was actually the date upon which the sixth chapter was made available to film exchanges.

The film was followed by a rerelease of Haunted Harbor, retitled as Pirates' Harbor, instead of a new serial. The next new serial, Radar Men from the Moon'', followed in 1952.

Chapter titles
 River of Fire (20 min)
 The Stolen Corpse (13 min 20s)
 The Death Drop (13 min 20s)
 Doorway to Doom (13 min 20s)
 Deadline for Disaster (13 min 20s)
 Mechanical Homicide (13 min 20s)
 The Flaming Highway (13 min 20s)
 Sea Saboteurs (13 min 20s)
 Peril Underground (13 min 20s)
 Execution by Accident (13 min 20s) (a recap chapter)
 Perilous Plunge (13 min 20s)
 Blazing Retribution (13 min 20s)
Source:

See also
 List of film serials by year
 List of film serials by studio

References

External links
 

1951 films
1950s English-language films
American spy films
American black-and-white films
Republic Pictures film serials
Films directed by Fred C. Brannon
1950s spy films
1950s American films